The Arctic Yellow River Station was established by the Polar Research Institute of China in Ny-Ålesund, on Svalbard, in 2003.

Scientists at the station conducted research into the Aurora Borealis and microbes in the ice-pack, glacier monitoring, atmospheric research.

See also
List of research stations in the Arctic
Antarctic Great Wall Station
Xuě Lóng
Antarctic Zhongshan Station
Arctic policy of China

References

Science and technology in the People's Republic of China
Research stations in Svalbard
Ny-Ålesund
2003 establishments in Norway
Polar Research Institute of China